Tetanolita mutatalis is a litter moth of the family Erebidae. It is found in Puerto Rico, the Bahamas, Jamaica and Cuba.

External links
Moths of Jamaica

Herminiinae
Moths described in 1890